Mateus Daniel Adão de Sá (born 21 November 1995 in Dracena) is a Brazilian athlete specialising in the triple jump. He represented his country at the 2017 World Championships without reaching the final. Additionally, he won the bronze medal at the 2014 World Junior Championships. He competed at the 2020 Summer Olympics.

His personal best in the event is 16.87 m (+0.5 m/s) set in São Bernardo do Campo in 2017.

International competitions

References

External links

1995 births
Living people
Brazilian male triple jumpers
World Athletics Championships athletes for Brazil
People from Dracena
South American Games silver medalists for Brazil
South American Games medalists in athletics
Athletes (track and field) at the 2018 South American Games
Universiade silver medalists for Brazil
Universiade medalists in athletics (track and field)
Competitors at the 2017 Summer Universiade
Medalists at the 2019 Summer Universiade
Athletes (track and field) at the 2020 Summer Olympics
Olympic athletes of Brazil
Sportspeople from São Paulo (state)
21st-century Brazilian people